In mathematics, Padovan polynomials are a generalization of Padovan sequence numbers.  These polynomials are defined by:

The first few Padovan polynomials are:

The Padovan numbers are recovered by evaluating the polynomials Pn−3(x) at x = 1.

Evaluating Pn−3(x) at x = 2 gives the nth Fibonacci number plus (−1)n.  

The ordinary generating function for the sequence is

See also
Polynomial sequences

Polynomials